Events in the year 1818 in Norway.

Incumbents
Monarch: Charles II (until 5 February); then Charles III John

Events

 5 February – Carl III of Sweden-Norway became King of Sweden and King of Norway following the death of Charles XIII.
 7 September – Carl III of Sweden-Norway is crowned king of Norway, in Trondheim.
 24 September – Start of the Bodø affair.
 Johan August Sandels is appointed Governor-general of Norway.

Notable births
 14 January – Ole Jacob Broch, politician and Minister (died 1889).
 13 February – Rolf Olsen, politician (died 1864)
 6 April – Aasmund Olavsson Vinje, poet, journalist and writer (died 1870).
 24 September – Diderik Iversen Tønseth, politician (died 1893)

Full date unknown
 Job Dischington Bødtker, jurist and politician (died 1889)
 Carl Peter Parelius Essendrop, bishop, politician and Minister (died 1893)
 Jacob Lerche Johansen, politician and Minister (died 1900)
 Henrik Andreas Zetlitz Lassen, politician
 Thorvald Meyer, businessperson (died 1909)
 Carsten Tank Nielsen, politician and Minister (died 1892)

Notable deaths
 5 March - Johan Andreas Cornelius Ohme, army officer (born 1746)
 25 March – Caspar Wessel, mathematician (born 1745).

Full date unknown
 Anders Trulsson Bruland, civil servant and politician (born 1770)

See also

References